Christians Creek is a  stream in Augusta County in the U.S. state of Virginia. It is a tributary of the Middle River, part of the Shenandoah River system flowing to the Potomac River.

See also
List of rivers of Virginia

References

USGS Hydrologic Unit Map - State of Virginia (1974)

Rivers of Virginia
Tributaries of the Shenandoah River
Rivers of Augusta County, Virginia